Martin Zumpft (born 11 October 1971) is a German former professional tennis player.

Zumpft competed on the ATP Tour during the 1990s, making doubles semi-finals at Casablanca in 1994 and at San Marino in 1995. He reached a career high singles ranking of 268 and best doubles ranking of 147 in the world.

Now based in the United States, Zumpft previously coached at the Nick Bollettieri/IMG Academy, where he was involved in training a young Maria Sharapova. After leaving the academy he was a coach of Mary Pierce.

Challenger titles

Doubles: (2)

References

External links
 
 

1971 births
Living people
German male tennis players
Tennis people from Baden-Württemberg
People from Wertheim am Main
Sportspeople from Stuttgart (region)